Kwanruethai Kunupatham (born 19 October 1990 ) is a Thai international footballer who plays as a defender.

International goals

External links 
 

1990 births
Living people
Kwanruethai Kunupatham
Women's association football defenders
Kwanruethai Kunupatham
Kwanruethai Kunupatham
Kwanruethai Kunupatham